Nikoloz Kakhelashvili (born 14 November 1995) is a Georgian-born Italian Greco-Roman wrestler. He is a two-time medalist at the European Wrestling Championships.

Career 

He represented Georgia in several competitions before switching to Italy in 2018.

He competed in the 97 kg event at the 2018 World Wrestling Championships held in Budapest, Hungary without winning a medal. He was eliminated in his first match by Artur Aleksanyan of Armenia. In 2020, he won the silver medal in the 97 kg event at the 2020 European Wrestling Championships held in Rome, Italy. In the final, he lost against Artur Aleksanyan.

In March 2021, he competed at the European Qualification Tournament in Budapest, Hungary hoping to qualify for the 2020 Summer Olympics in Tokyo, Japan. He won his first two matches but then lost his match in the semi-finals against Arvi Savolainen of Finland. In April 2021, he won one of the bronze medals in the 97 kg event at the 2021 European Wrestling Championships held in Warsaw, Poland. In May 2021, he also failed to qualify for the Olympics at the World Olympic Qualification Tournament held in Sofia, Bulgaria. In October 2021, he lost his bronze medal match in the 97 kg event at the 2021 World Wrestling Championships held in Oslo, Norway.

In 2022, he competed in the 97 kg event at the European Wrestling Championships in Budapest, Hungary where he was eliminated in his first match. A few months later, he won the silver medal in his event at the Matteo Pellicone Ranking Series 2022 held in Rome, Italy. He lost his bronze medal match in the 97kg event at the 2022 World Wrestling Championships held in Belgrade, Serbia.

Achievements

References

External links 

 

Living people
1995 births
Male sport wrestlers from Georgia (country)
Italian people of Georgian descent
Italian male sport wrestlers
European Wrestling Championships medalists
21st-century Italian people